This is a list of the etymology of street names in the London district of Bloomsbury. The following utilises the generally accepted boundaries of Bloomsbury viz. Euston Road to the north, Gray's Inn Road to the east, New Oxford Street, High Holborn, Southampton Row and Theobald's Road to the south and Tottenham Court Road to the west.

 Adeline Place – after Adeline Marie Russell, Duchess of Bedford, wife of George Russell, 10th Duke of Bedford, local landowner
 Alfred Mews and Alfred Place – after Alfred Waddilove, son of John, who built this street in 1806
 Argyle Square, Argyll Street and Argyle Walk – named for Argyll in Scotland
 Bainbridge Street – after Henry Bainbridge, local resident in the 17th century
 Barbon Close – after 17th-century property developer Nicholas Barbon
 Barter Street – after the Bloomsbury Market, which stood here in the 17th – 19th centuries
 Bayley Street – after Sir John Bayley, 1st Baronet, 18th–19th-century judge who lived nearby on Bedford Square
 Beaumont Place – after Joseph Beaumont, who built this street in 1791
 Bedford Avenue, Bedford Place, Bedford Square and Bedford Way – after local 18th-century landowners the Russell family, earls/dukes of Bedford
 Belgrove Street – formerly Belgrave Street, thought to be for a Warwickshire locality of this name
 Bernard Street – after Sir Thomas Bernard, 3rd Baronet, 18th–19th-century social reformer who held several high level positions at the nearby Foundling Hospital
 Bidborough Street – after Bidborough in Kent, home county of local 16th-century landowner Andrew Judd
 Birkenhead Street – after Birkenhead in Cheshire; formerly Liverpool Street
 Bloomsbury Court, Bloomsbury Place, Bloomsbury Square, Bloomsbury Street and Bloomsbury Way – the name is first noted in 1201, when William de Blemond, a Norman landowner, acquired the land The name Bloomsbury is a development from Blemondisberi – the bury, or manor, of Blemond.
 Boswell Court and Boswell Street – after local 17th bricklayer Edward Boswell
 Brownlow Mews – after William Brownlow, local 17th-century landowner (further to the south, hence Brownlow Street in Holborn); his daughter Elizabeth married into the Doughty family, who owned land in this area
 Brunswick Square – after the German city of Braunschweig (Brunswick), by connection with the reigning House of Hanover
 Burton Place and Burton Street – after the 18th-century architect James Burton, who worked on the nearby Foundling Hospital and Bedford estate
 Bury Place – a shortening of ‘Bloomsbury’
 Byng Place – after George Byng, 4th Viscount Torrington, father-in-law to local landowner John Russell, 6th Duke of Bedford
 Capper Street – after the Capper farmer, tenant farmers on this land in the 17th – 18th centuries
 Cartwright Gardens – after John Cartwright, 19th-century political reformer who lived here; it was originally Burton Crescent, after the architect James Burton
 Chenies Mews and Chenies Street – after local landowners the dukes of Bedford, also titled Barons Russell, of Chenies
 Cockpit Yard – site of a cock fighting yard in the 18th century
 Colonnade – this was formerly a Georgian-era colonnade of shops
 Compton Place
 Coptic Street – named in 1894 after a recent acquisition of Coptic manuscripts by the British Museum; before this it was Duke Street, after the dukes of Bedford
 Coram Street – after Thomas Coram, 18th-century founder of the Foundling Hospital which was formerly near here
 Cosmo Place – after Cosmo George Gordon, 3rd Duke of Gordon, grandfather of Lady Georgiana, wife of local landowner John Russell, 6th Duke of Bedford
 Crestfield Street – unknown, formerly Chesterfield Street
 Cromer Street – formerly Lucas Street, which had gained notoriety due to the landlord of a local inn (the Lucas Arms) being involved with the Gordon Riots; it was changed to the neutral Cromer, for the town in Norfolk Dombey Street – named is 1936 after local resident Charles Dickens’s book Dombey and Son; it was formerly East Street, in relation to the nearby New North StreetBebbington, G. (1972) London Street Names, p112
 Doughty Mews and Doughty Street – after the Doughty family, local landowners in the 18th centuryBebbington, G. (1972) London Street Names, p112-3
 Dukes Road – after the dukes of Bedford, local landownersBebbington, G. (1972) London Street Names, p117
 Dyott Street – after either Simon Dyott, local resident in the 17th century or Jane Dyott, granddaughter or local landowner Henry Bainbridge
 Emerald Court and Emerald Street – Green Street prior to 1885, changed to avoid confusion with numerous other streets of that nameBebbington, G. (1972) London Street Names, p123
 Endsleigh Gardens, Endsleigh Place and Endsleigh Street – after Endsleigh, a property in Tavistock, Devon owned by the dukes of BedfordBebbington, G. (1972) London Street Names, p124
 Euston Road – after the earl of Euston, son of the duke of Grafton, local landowners when the road was built in the 1760sBebbington, G. (1972) London Street Names, p126
 Flaxman Terrace – after the John Flaxman, 18th–19th-century sculptor who is buried at the nearby St Pancras Old ChurchBebbington, G. (1972) London Street Names, p133
 Gage Street – unknown Galen Place – after Ancient Greek physician Galen, by connection with the Pharmaceutical Society whose examination hall formerly stood here
 Gilbert Place
 Gordon Square and Gordon Street – after Cosmo George Gordon, 3rd Duke of Gordon, grandfather of Lady Georgiana, wife of local landowner John Russell, 6th Duke of BedfordBebbington, G. (1972) London Street Names, p146
 Gower Court, Gower Mews, Gower Place and Gower Street – after Gertrude Leveson-Gower, wife of local landowner John Russell, 4th Duke of BedfordBebbington, G. (1972) London Street Names, p147
 Grafton Way – after local landowners the dukes of Grafton
 Gray's Inn Road – from Lord Grey of Wilton, owner of a local inn or town house which was later leased to lawyers in the 16th centuryBebbington, G. (1972) London Street Names, p149
 Great James Street – after James Burgess who worked with George Brownlow Doughty and his wife Frances Tichborne in the development of the area.
 Great Ormond Street, Ormond Close and Ormond Mews – thought to commemorate James Butler, 1st Duke of Ormonde, prominent 17th-century soldierBebbington, G. (1972) London Street Names, p151
 Great Russell Street – see Russell Square Grenville Street – after William Wyndham Grenville, 1st Baron Grenville, prominent 19th-century politician
 Guilford Place and Guilford Street – after Prime Minister Lord North, 2nd Earl of Guildford, who was also President of the nearby Foundling Hospital from 1771 until his death
 Handel Street – after the 18th-century composer George Frederick Handel, a benefactor of the nearby Foundling Hospital and organist at its chapel
 Harpur Mews and Harpur Street – after either local 18th-century landowner Peter Harpur or Sir William Harpur, founder of the Bedford School
 Harrison Street – after local 18th–19th-century landowners and brickmakers the Harrison familyBebbington, G. (1972) London Street Names, p334
 Hastings Street – after Hastings in Sussex, near to Kent, home county of local 16th-century landowner Andrew Judd
 Heathcote Street – after Michael Heathcote, governor of the nearby Foundling Hospital in the early 19th century
 Henrietta Mews – named after Foundling Hospital vice-president (mid-19th century) Sir Stephen Gaselee's wife Henrietta
 Herbrand Street – after local landowner Herbrand Arthur Russell, 11th Duke of BedfordBebbington, G. (1972) London Street Names, p171
 High Holborn – thought to be from ‘hollow bourne’ i.e. the river Fleet which formerly flowed in a valley near here. The ‘High’ stems from the fact that the road led away from the river to higher ground.Bebbington, G. (1972) London Street Names, p174
 Hunter Street – after prominent 18th-century surgeon John Hunter, by association with adjacent School of MedicineBebbington, G. (1972) London Street Names, p180
 Huntley Street – after Cosmo George Gordon, 3rd Duke of Gordon, Marquess of Huntly grandfather of Lady Georgiana, wife of local landowner John Russell, 6th Duke of Bedford
 John's Mews and John Street – after local 18th-century carpenter John Blagrave
 Judd Street – after Andrew Judd, who developed the local area via the Skinners’ Company in the 1570s
 Kenton Street – after the 18th-century vintner Benjamin Kenton, benefactor of the nearby Foundling Hospital
 Keppel Street – after Elizabeth Keppel, wife of local landowner Francis Russell, Marquess of TavistockBebbington, G. (1972) London Street Names, p188
 King's Mews – by association with Theobald's Road, formerly King's Way
 Kirk Street
 Lamb's Conduit Street – named after William Lambe, in recognition of the £1,500 he gave for the rebuilding of the Holborn Conduit in 1564. (According to The London Encyclopaedia, "The conduit was an Elizabethan dam made in one of the tributaries of the Fleet River and restored in 1577 by William Lamb, who also provided 120 pails for poor women")
 Lamp Office Court –
 Lansdowne Terrace – after William Petty, 1st Marquess of Lansdowne, Prime Minister 1782–83
 Leigh Street – after Leigh in Kent, home county of local 16th-century landowner Andrew Judd
 Long Yard – simply a descriptive name for this former stable yard
 Loxham Street – possibly for directors of the East End Dwellings Company who developed these streets in the 1890s
 Lytton Court
 Mabledon Place – after Mabledon House near Tonbridge in Kent, built by James Burton in 1804 and extended by his son Decimus Burton. Kent was the home county of local 16th-century landowner Andrew Judd
 Malet Place and Malet Street – after Sir Edward Baldwin Malet, 4th Baronet, husband of Lady Ermyntrude Sackville Russell, daughter of local landowner Francis Russell, 9th Duke of BedfordBebbington, G. (1972) London Street Names, p210
 Marchmont Street – after Hugh Hume-Campbell, 3rd Earl of Marchmont, governor of the nearby Foundling Hospital
 Mecklenburgh Place, Mecklenburgh Square and Mecklenburgh Street – after Queen Charlotte of Mecklenburg-Strelitz, wife George III, reigning monarch when the square was built
 Midhope Street – possibly for directors of the East End Dwellings Company who developed these streets in the 1890s
 Millman Mews, Millman Place and Millman Street – after local 17th-century landowner William MillmanBebbington, G. (1972) London Street Names, p221
 Montague Place and Montague Street – after Montagu House, built in the 1670 for Ralph Montagu, 1st Duke of Montagu, which was formerly on the site of the British MuseumBebbington, G. (1972) London Street Names, p223-4
 Mortimer Market – after the market formerly on this site, founded by Hans Winthrop Mortimer in 1768Bebbington, G. (1972) London Street Names, p226
 Morwell Street – after Morwell in Devon, where local landowners the dukes of Bedford held land
 Museum Street – after the British Museum adjacentBebbington, G. (1972) London Street Names, p228
 New North Street – as it leads northwards from Red Lions Square, ‘New’ so as to contract with Old North Street which continues southwardsBebbington, G. (1972) London Street Names, p231
 North Crescent and South Crescent – simply description of their shape
 Northington Street – after Robert Henley, 1st Earl of Northington, Lord Chancellor 1761–66Bebbington, G. (1972) London Street Names, p236
 North Mews – after Lord North, Prime Minister
 Old Gloucester Street – after Prince William, Duke of Gloucester, son of Queen Anne; the street was formerly just ‘Gloucester Street’ until 1873Bebbington, G. (1972) London Street Names, p240
 Orde Hall Street – after Orde Hall, 19th-century chairman representing this area at the Metropolitan Board of WorksBebbington, G. (1972) London Street Names, p242
 Pied Bull Court and Pied Bull Yard –
 Powis Place – former site of Powis House, built for William Herbert, 2nd Marquess of Powis, a prominent 17th–18th-century JacobiteBebbington, G. (1972) London Street Names, p264
 Queen Anne's Walk and Queen Square and Queen Square Place – after Queen Anne, reigning monarch when the square was laid outBebbington, G. (1972) London Street Names, p267
 Queen's Yard
 Regent Square – after the Prince Regent, later George IV; the square dates to after the Regency ended, however the name has already been chosen years beforeBebbington, G. (1972) London Street Names, p274
 Richbell Place – after its 18th-century builder, John RichbellBebbington, G. (1972) London Street Names, p275
 Ridgmount Gardens, Ridgmount Place and Ridgmount Street – after Ridgmont, Bedfordshire, where the dukes of Bedford also owned landBebbington, G. (1972) London Street Names, p276
 Roger Street – renamed in 1937 from ‘Henry Street’, after local landowner Henry DoughtyBebbington, G. (1972) London Street Names, p277
 Rossetti Court
 Rugby Street – after Rugby School; its founder Lawrence Sheriff gave land here in 1567 as an endowmentBebbington, G. (1972) London Street Names, p281
 Russell Square and Great Russell Street – after local landowner the Russells, Dukes of Bedford
 St Chad's Street – after the nearby St Chad's well, reputed to be a medieval holy well; St Chad was a 7th-century bishopBebbington, G. (1972) London Street Names, p284
St Giles Circus, St Giles High Street and St Giles Passage – after St Giles Hospital, a leper hospital founded by Matilda of Scotland, wife of Henry I in 1117. It later became St Giles in the Fields. St Giles was an 8th-century hermit in Provence who was crippled in a hunting accident and later became patron saint of cripples and lepers. Circus is a British term for a road junction.Bebbington, G. (1972) London Street Names, p286
 St Peter's Court
 Sandwich Street – after Sandwich in Kent, home county of local 16th-century landowner Andrew Judd
 Seaford Street – thought to be named for Seaford in Sussex
 Shropshire Place
 Sicilian Avenue – this Italianate arch is built from Sicilian marbleBebbington, G. (1972) London Street Names, p302
 Sidmouth Mews and Sidmouth Street – either for Sidmouth in Devon, then a fashionable resort town or Prime Minister Henry Addington, 1st Viscount Sidmouth
Southampton Place and Southampton Row – Southampton House, home of the earls of Southampton, formerly stood here in the 16th centuryBebbington, G. (1972) London Street Names, 305-6
 South Crescent Mews
 Speedy Place – after the Speedy family, landlords of the former nearby pub the Golden Boot
 Stedham Place
 Store Street – unknown''
 Streatham Street – after Streatham, where local landowners the dukes of Bedford also owned property
 Tankerton Street – possibly for directors of the East End Dwellings Company who developed these streets in the 1890s
 Tavistock Place and Tavistock Square – after Tavistock, Devon, where the dukes of Bedford owned property
 Taviton Street – after Taviton, Devon, where the dukes of Bedford owned property
 Thanet Street – after Thanet in Kent, home county of local 16th-century landowner Andrew Judd
 Theobald's Road – this road formerly formed part of a route used by Stuart monarchs to their hunting grounds at Theobalds House, Hertfordshire
 Thornhaugh Mews and Thornhaugh Street – after local landowners the dukes of Bedford, also titled Barons Russell of Thornhaugh
 Tonbridge Street and Tonbridge Walk – after Tonbridge in Kent, home town of Andrew Judd, local landowner of the 16th century
 Torrington Place and Torrington Square – after George Byng, 4th Viscount Torrington, father-in-law to local landowner John Russell, 6th Duke of Bedford
 Tottenham Court Road, Tottenham Mews and Tottenham Street – after the former manor of Tottenham (Tottenhall) which stood here from the 13th century, possibly from one local William de Tottenall, or else meaning ‘Tota’s Hall’. The name later became confused with the unconnected Tottenham, Middlesex
 United Alley
 University Street – due to its location near London University
 Vernon Place – after Elizabeth Wriothesley, Countess of Southampton, (née Vernon), ancestor to Rachel Russell, Lady Russell, wife of William Russell, Lord Russell of the local landowning Russell family
 Wakefield Mews and Wakefield Street – after a former local pub, the Pindar of Wakefield
 Westking Place
 Whidborne Street – possibly for directors of the East End Dwellings Company who developed these streets in the 1890s
 Willoughby Street – after George P. Willoughby, mayor of Holborn Borough in the 1910s
 Woburn Place, Woburn Square, Woburn Walk and Upper Woburn Place – after Woburn Abbey, principal seat of local landowners the dukes of Bedford
 Woolf Mews – presumably after the author and local resident Virginia Woolf

References

Bibliography 

 

Streets in the London Borough of Camden
Lists of United Kingdom placename etymology
Bloomsbury
Bloomsbury
England geography-related lists